"This Must Be Love" was the sixth single to be released by Little Man Tate. It was released on 26 March 2007 and reached #33 in the UK singles chart. The music video starred veteran British actress Liz Smith.

Track listings 

CD
 "This Must Be Love"
 "Hello Miss Lovely (So You Like My Jeans)?"
 "Too Quick to Type"
 "The Self Appreciation Club"

7" vinyl picture disc
 "This Must Be Love"
 "The Self Appreciation Club"

7" vinyl
 "Download
 "This Must Be Love" (live at Sea)
 "This Must Be Love" (live at the Boule Noir)

References

2007 singles
Little Man Tate (band) songs
2007 songs
V2 Records singles